Harley is a unisex given name. The name is derived from the Old English words hara meaning hare, and leah, meaning wood or clearing and meadow in later development of the language. The name Harley means "hare's meadow".

Harley first became popular in the year 1880, where it was the 180th most popular masculine given name in the United States, the name first became popular as a feminine given name in 1991, and became the 667th most popular feminine given name during that year.

Academics 
 Harley Flanders (1925–2013), an American mathematician
 Harley Rutledge (1926–2006), an American physics professor and ufologist

Artists 
 Harley Parker (1915–1992), a Canadian artist, designer, curator, professor and scholar
 Harley Schwadron, an American cartoonist
 Harley Refsal, an American artist and woodcarver

Performers 
 Harley Allen (born 1956), an American country singer and songwriter
 Harley Alexander-Sule (born 1991), English singer in Rizzle Kicks
 Harley Bird (born 2001), English actress and voice actress, best known for providing the voice of Peppa Pig in Peppa Pig from 2007 to 2020.
 Harley Brinsfield, an American radio personality and host of The Harley Show
 Harley Cross (born 1978), an American film and television actor
 Harley Flanagan (born 1968), musician and member of the 1980s hardcore punk band Cro-Mags
 Harley Granville-Barker (1877–1946), an English actor, director, producer, critic and playwright
 Harley Jane Kozak (born 1957), an American actress and author
 Harley Edward Streten (born 1991), an Australian DJ known professionally as Flume
 Harley Venton (born 1953), an American actor

Politicians 

 Harley Desjarlais, a regional Métis leader in Canada
 Harley Frank, a First Nations leader in southern Alberta, Canada
 Harley M. Jacklin (1889–1970), an American politician
 Harley Martin Kilgore (1893–1956), a United States Senator from West Virginia
 Harley Eugene Knox (1899–1956), an American independent politician from California
 Harley A. Martin (1880–1951), an American politician
 Harley Orrin Staggers (1907–1991), a Democratic U.S. politician
 Harley O. Staggers, Jr. (born 1951), a U.S. Democratic politician

Sportspeople 
 Harley Boss (1908–1964), a Major League Baseball first baseman
 Harley Dillinger (1894–1959), an American Major League Baseball pitcher
 Harley Hisner (1926–2015), a former starting pitcher in Major League Baseball
 Harley the Nightrider, a professional wrestler from All-Star Wrestling
 Harley Lewis (born 1971), an American professional wrestler
 Harley Marques Silva (born 1975), a Brazilian beach volleyball champion
 Harley McCollum (1916–1984), an American football tackle
 Harley Payne (1868–1935), a former American professional baseball player
 Harley Sewell (1931–2011), a former American football guard
 Harley Race (1943–2019), American professional wrestler and promoter

 Harley Windsor (born 1996), Australian ice skater

Others 
 Harley H. Christy (1870–1950), a Vice Admiral of the United States Navy
 Harley Earl (1894–1969), car designer and coachbuilder, the first styling chief at General Motors
 Harley Hotchkiss (1927–2011) a Canadian businessman
 Harley Pasternak (born 1974), a Canadian personal trainer, public speaker and author
 Harley Peyton, an American television producer and writer
 Harley Oliver Teets (1906–1957), American law enforcement official and warden of San Quentin State Prison

Fictional characters 
 Harley Gwen, a character in Marvel Comics' Gwenpool franchise; see Harley Quinn
 Harley Hartwell, a teenage detective from the Case Closed/Detective Conan anime
 Harley Keener, a character in Iron Man 3 and the Marvel Cinematic Universe
 Harley Keiner, a character in the television series Boy Meets World and Girl Meets World
 Harley Merlin, the title character in the literary series Harley Merlin
 Harley Quinn, a DC Comics character created by Paul Dini and Bruce Timm, and first appeared in Batman: The Animated Series in September 1992.
 Harley Warren, a character in H. P. Lovecraft's story "The Statement of Randolph Carter"
 Harley, a Pokémon anime character
 Mr. Harley, a character in Henry Mackenzie's sentimental novel The Man of Feeling
 Harley Diaz, a character in Disney Channel’s Stuck in the Middle (TV series)

See also
 Harley (disambiguation)
 Harley (surname)

References

 

English given names